These are the complete Grand Prix racing results for Arrows Grand Prix International, also including Footwork Arrows.

Complete Formula One World Championship results
(key)

Non-Championship results
(key) (results in bold indicate pole position; results in italics indicate fastest lap)

Notes

References

Formula One constructor results
results